Slovin is a surname. Notable people with the surname include:

Hamutal Slovin (born 1967), Israeli neuroscientist
Rochelle Slovin, American theater actress and museum director